The 1900–01 Northern Football League season was the twelfth in the history of the Northern Football League, a football competition in Northern England. The league reverted to a single division after having two divisions for the previous three seasons.

Clubs

The league featured 8 clubs which competed in the last season, along with three new clubs, promoted from last seasons's Division Two: 
 Whitby
 West Hartlepool
 Scarborough

League table

References

1900-01
1900–01 in English association football leagues